Middlebrook is a census-designated place in Augusta County, Virginia. The population as of the 2020 Census was 184.

Middlebrook Historic District, Middlebrook Schools, A. J. Miller House, Henry Mish Barn and Maple Front Farm are listed on the National Register of Historic Places.

Demographics

References

Census-designated places in Augusta County, Virginia
Census-designated places in Virginia